Kars Veling (born 30 June 1948) is a retired Dutch politician and philosopher. A member of the Reformed Political League (GPV) and later Christian Union (CU), he served as Leader of the Christian Union from 2001 to 2002.

Education
Veling followed the HBS-B education in Groningen, the town where he was born. After finishing the HBS, he studied Mathematics, physics and astronomy at the University of Groningen, where he received his candidate exam (comparable with a bachelor's degree). After that he studies philosophy and promoted at the faculty of social sciences of the University of Leiden in 1982.

Career
After finishing his study in Groningen in 1969, Veling started as a teacher in mathematics for five years in Groningen. From 1972 until 1987 he taught philosophy at the Gereformeerde Sociale Academie (Reformed Social Academy) in Zwolle. He was vice director of that academy from 1974 until 1980. He was also lector at the theological Kampen Theological University of the Reformed Churches (Liberated) from 1972 until 1987, when he became special professor at the same university (dissertation: Methodologie en de grondslagen van een pluriforme sociologie (methodology and the foundations of a pluriform sociology)).

In 1988 Veling became vice rector of the reformed high school-group Prof.dr. S. Greijdanus in Zwolle for seven years. From 11 June 1991 until 12 November 2002 Veling was member of the Dutch Parliament. Until 16 May 2002 he was member of the First Chamber (Senate) of the Parliament, the rest of the time member of the Second Chamber and president of the fraction of the Christen Union. First, Veling represented the GPV in the parliament, and after the fusion with the RPF he was fraction president of the joint fraction of GPV and RPF and after the May 2002 elections the Christen Union.

After his party lost the elections of November 2002, Veling stepped down from the politics, and returned in June 2003 to education. He became rector of the Johan de Witt College school group in The Hague.

Decorations

References

External links

Official
  Dr. K. (Kars) Veling Parlement & Politiek
  Dr. K. Veling (ChristenUnie) Eerste Kamer der Staten-Generaal

 

 

 

 

1948 births
Living people
Christian Union (Netherlands) politicians
Dutch academic administrators
Dutch Calvinist and Reformed theologians
Dutch ethicists
Dutch historians of religion
Dutch historians of philosophy
Dutch nonprofit executives
Dutch nonprofit directors
Dutch political activists
Dutch political writers
Leaders of the Christian Union (Netherlands)
Leiden University alumni
Members of the House of Representatives (Netherlands)
Members of the Senate (Netherlands)
Officers of the Order of Orange-Nassau
Politicians from Groningen (city)
People from Zwolle
Reformed Churches (Liberated) Christians from the Netherlands
Reformed Political League politicians
University of Groningen alumni
20th-century Dutch educators
20th-century Dutch male writers
20th-century Dutch politicians
20th-century Dutch philosophers
21st-century Dutch educators
21st-century Dutch male writers
21st-century Dutch politicians
21st-century Dutch philosophers